FSN may refer to:

 fsn (file manager), a 3-D file manager that appeared in the movie Jurassic Park
 Fate/stay night, a visual novel
 Feature Story News, an international broadcast news agency
 Federal State of Novorossiya, a separatist entity in eastern Ukraine
 Federal Stock Number, a defunct codification system used by the United States federal government
 Federation of Student Nationalists, the student wing of the Scottish National Party
 Fjölbrautaskóli Snæfellinga, an Icelandic high school (menntaskóli) located in Grundarfjörður
 FN Five-seven, a Belgian pistol
 Fox Sports Networks, an American television network
 Fox Sports News (Australia), an Australian television channel
 Fox Sports North, the former name of an American regional sports network by Fox Sports Networks
 Full Service Network, an American telecommunications company
 Fu's subcutaneous needle
 National Social Front, an Italian political party
 National Salvation Front (Romania), a defunct Romanian political party